California style or California look may refer to any one of a wide range of subjects related to the culture of California:

 The "California Look" created by California designer Michael Taylor
 Cal looker, or California looker, a Volkswagen Bug modification originating in California
 California cuisine, a style of cooking originating in California
 California-style pizza, pizza using elements of California cuisine
 Ranch-style house, an architectural style originating in California
 California bungalow, an architectural style originating in California
 California Plein-Air Painting, a plein-air painting style originating in California
 California Scene, a style of early 20th century watercolor painting associated with the Chouinard Art Institute and Hollywood animation studios such as Walt Disney
 The California style of Western horse riding, which uses the Romal

California culture